Gong is a surname which can be found throughout Eurasian continent.  It is the English transcription of a number of different Chinese surnames: 江, 宫, 龔, 共, 公, 鞏, 功, 貢, and 弓.  Gong may also be a Korean surname, but this Korean  Gong may be the English transcription of another surname Kong (孔).

Surname Gong 江

Surname Gong 龔, 共

Gong (rank 192 in China), also transcribed as Kung or Kong from Cantonese (Hong Kong and Macao), Jiong or Jun in Shanghainese, is the 99th most prevalent Chinese surname listed in the ancient Song Dynasty classic text, "Hundred Family Surnames". In Chinese writing, the character "龚" is composed of the two characters 龙 (upper character, meaning dragon) and 共 (lower character, meaning altogether, common, general, shared, or together).

As of 2002, there are around 1.5 million people with the Gong 龚 surname in China, representing 0.2% of its population. They are most commonly found along the Yangtze River basin, especially in the province of Anhui.

Origin
According to one story, the surname Gong 龔 was derived from the other Gong (共).  An ancestor of the Gong clan with the surname 共 had to flee from troubles, and change his surname from 共 to 龔 by adding the character for dragon (龍) on top.  According to other legends, they are the descendants of a minister of the Huang Emperor named Gong Gu (共鼓), or the descendants of Gong Gong (共工), a minister of Emperor Yao.

The Gong surname may also be derived from the Gong tribe of the Ba state in Sichuan, and during the Han Dynasty there were a number of prominent people with surname Gong from the lower reaches of Jialing River.

Gong clan from Gong (state) (共國) ruler, before the Zhou Dynasty
Gong clan from Zhou Dynasty royal 
Gong clan from Zheng (state) royal of Zhou Dynasty 
Gong clan from Wei (state) royal of Zhou Dynasty
Gong clan from Jin (Chinese state) royal of Zhou Dynasty
Gong clan from Xiong (熊) clan of Chu (state)

Prominent people with the Kong (龔, 共) surname
 Gong Xian, painter
 Gong Wei, ruler of the Kingdom of Linjiang of the Eighteen Kingdoms during the Chu–Han Contention 
 Gong Ao, ruler of the Kingdom of Linjiang of the Eighteen Kingdoms during the Chu–Han Contention
 Gong Ruina, female badminton player
 Gong Zhichao, female badminton player
 Kiong Kong Tuan, Hokkien merchant
 Kung Ming-hsin, Deputy Minister of Economic Affairs of the Republic of China

Surname Gong 公
Gong (rank 408 of china), is a Chinese and Korean surname.  The other Gong surnames 共, 龔, 鞏, 功, 貢 have disappeared from Korea.

from Lu (state) clan of Zhou Dynasty
Gong may be derived from china's a two-syllable family names: 
公为、公华、公慎、公孟、公之、公父、公冉、公甲、公古、公文、公德、公良、公孙、公车、公金、公都、公建、公山、公祖、公宾、公仪、公输、公敛、公思、公若、公林、公坚、公施、公荆、公仲、公朱、公上、公叔、公仇、公行、公成、公师、公族、公正、公明、公子、公土、公襄、公牛、公玉、公牵、公干、公旗、公丘、公羊、公西、公何、公冶、公巫、公宣、公夏、公析、

Gong + 孫, 羊, 石 are two-syllable surnames from the Zhou Dynasty
Gong Yang (公羊) clan from ruler Ji Ye (子野) son of Lu (state)
Gong Shi (公石) clan from ruler Ji Ban (子般) son of Lu (state) 
Gong Sun (公孫) clan from royal Zi Chan (子產, 子产) of Zheng (state)

Surname Gong 鞏, 巩
Gong, rank 370 in China
from Zhou Dynasty clan
from Qiang people alike Tibet people
from Jin (state) clan

Surname Gong 功
Gong, Chinese surname
from Jiang (姜) clan,
from noble of Song (state)
from Mongol people

Surname Gong 貢
Gong, Chinese surname 
from add-name Ji Gong(子貢) of DuanMu Ci(端木賜)
DuanMu(端木:DyunMuk) clan from Shaohao(少昊)

Surname Gong 宫
Gong, Chinese surname 
 Ranks 240th in Hundred Family Surnames
 Mainly derived from Ji (surname 冀)

Others
Gong, common form of Kong in Korea.

References 

Chinese-language surnames
Multiple Chinese surnames